Jumaane D. Williams (born May 11, 1976) is an American activist and politician who has served as the New York City Public Advocate since 2019. He is a former member of the New York City Council from the 45th district, which includes East Flatbush, Flatbush, Flatlands, Marine Park, and Midwood in Brooklyn.

A member of the Democratic Party and a self-described democratic socialist, Williams served as Deputy Leader of the city council and chair of the Task Force on City Workforce Equity. A candidate for Lieutenant Governor of New York in 2018, he lost to incumbent Kathy Hochul. Williams was elected New York City Public Advocate in the 2019 special election to complete the term of Letitia James, who resigned to become Attorney General of New York. On November 16, 2021, Williams announced his intention to run for governor in 2022. He lost the Democratic primary to incumbent Governor Kathy Hochul by a margin of more than 48%.

Early life and education 
Williams's parents, Greg and Patricia Williams, are from St. Andrew, Grenada. His father was a footballer and cricketer who represented the students of Grenada Boys Secondary School (GBSS) before moving to the U.S. to study medicine. He has a brother.

Williams is an alumnus of Brooklyn Technical High School and Brooklyn College, from which he received a Bachelor of Arts in political science in 2001 and a Master of Arts in urban policy and administration in 2005.

Political career

New York City Council (2010–2019) 
Williams was elected after defeating incumbent Councilmember Kendall Stewart in the September 2009 Democratic primary by a margin of 12 points. Williams won the general election with an endorsement from the Working Families Party. He was easily reelected in 2013.

In June 2013, the New York City Council passed Williams's Community Safety Act, which established an Inspector General to oversee the New York Police Department (NYPD) and created an enforceable ban against bias-based profiling. The Act was passed over then-Mayor Michael Bloomberg's veto. Williams has been an outspoken opponent of the NYPD's approach to stop-and-frisk in New York City.

In July 2013, Williams introduced "house party" legislation requiring parties with 40 or more people in attendance to register with the police. He also wants event organizers who advertise on social media and those charging admission to pay fines.

On June 29, 2015, Mayor Bill de Blasio signed Williams's legislation, the Fair Chance Act, commonly known as Ban the Box. The law prohibits public and private employers from inquiring about an applicant's criminal history until a conditional offer of employment is made.

On August 13, 2015, the New York City Council passed Intro. 700, Williams's legislation, which, along with bills sponsored by Council Speaker Melissa Mark Viverito and Council Member Dan Garodnick, established regulations for "tenant relocation specialists", people landlords employ to buy out tenants. The mayor signed the legislation into law on September 9, 2015.

Williams has cited his religious beliefs as an influence on his views on issues such as LGBTQ marriage and abortion. He expressed conservative views on LGBTQ rights and abortion early in his political career, but has since affirmed his support for LGBTQ marriage and abortion rights. As of 2019, Williams had reportedly received a 100% rating from the Planned Parenthood of New York City Action Fund.

Williams resigned from office to become Public Advocate on March 19, 2019. He declined to back his former staffer, Farah Louis, to succeed him on the city council, instead endorsing Monique Chandler-Waterman. Despite this, Louis defeated Chandler-Waterman in the May special election.

Activism

On September 5, 2011, during the West Indian Day Parade in Brooklyn, Williams and Kirsten John Foy, director of community relations for then-New York City Public Advocate Bill de Blasio, were arrested and handcuffed for walking along a closed-off sidewalk, after having received permission to do so from other officers.

Williams was a supporter of the Occupy Wall Street movement, and in September 2012 was assaulted by a member of the NYPD at an Occupy Wall Street event.

Williams was also arrested in 2018 for protesting the detention of immigrant-rights activist Ravi Ragbir after Ragbir was detained during one of his regular check-ins with ICE.

2018 lieutenant gubernatorial campaign 
In 2018, Williams challenged incumbent Lieutenant Governor Kathy Hochul in the Democratic primary for lieutenant governor, running on a platform of anti-corruption, affordable housing, and criminal justice reform. Williams and Cynthia Nixon, who challenged incumbent Governor Andrew Cuomo in the Democratic gubernatorial primary, endorsed each other. Williams lost the primary by less than seven points.

New York City Public Advocate (2019–present)

Williams ran in the 2019 special election for New York City Public Advocate when Letitia James vacated her seat to become New York state attorney general. The New York Times endorsed him in both his 2018 campaign for lieutenant governor and his 2019 campaign for public advocate. The Democratic Socialists of America endorsed him in 2018 but in 2019 did not endorse anyone for Public Advocate. The New York Daily News broke the story of his 2009 arrest in a domestic dispute, publishing records that had been sealed, which were used by rival candidates.

Nevertheless, in a crowded field with 18 other candidates, including former council speaker Melissa Mark-Viverito and state assemblyman Michael Blake, Williams won, with 33% of the vote to Mark-Viverito's 11% and Blake's 8%. Republican Eric Ulrich received 19%. In his post-election remarks Williams said that he would work with Mayor de Blasio. The race cost the city $17 million. He was certified and sworn into office on March 19, 2019.

2022 gubernatorial campaign 

On September 28, 2021, Williams announced the formation of an exploratory committee to seek the Democratic nomination for governor in 2022. Should he run, he would once again challenge Hochul, who ascended to the governorship after Cuomo resigned. On November 16, 2021, Williams formally announced his bid for governor. In July 2022, the Working Families Party dropped him from the ballot, which ended his campaign.

Personal life
Williams was diagnosed with Attention deficit hyperactivity disorder (ADHD) and Tourette syndrome as a child and has been an advocate for people living with those conditions.

Williams is a Baptist.

Electoral history

References

External links 

 

|-

1976 births
20th-century African-American people
21st-century African-American politicians
21st-century American politicians
African-American New York City Council members
American people of Grenadian descent
Baptists from New York (state)
Brooklyn College alumni
Candidates in the 2018 United States elections
Living people
American democratic socialists
New York (state) Democrats
New York (state) socialists
New York City Council members
New York City Public Advocates
People with Tourette syndrome
Politicians from Brooklyn